The Women's sprint at the 2012 UCI Track Cycling World Championships was held on April 5–6. 29 cyclists participated in the contest.

Medalists

Results

Qualifying
The Qualifying was held at 13:30, the top 24 riders qualified for the next round.

Finals

1/16 Finals
The 1/16 Finals were held at 14:20.

1/8 Finals 
The 1/8 Finals were held at 16:15.

Repechage 
The 1/8 Finals Repechage were held at 17:10.

Quarterfinals 
The quarterfinals were held at 19:00 and 19:30.

Race 5th–8th Place 
The race for 5th–8th Places was held at 22:00.

Semifinals 
The semifinals were held at 19:00, 19:40 and 20:15.

Small Final 
The finals were held at 20:45 and 21:35.

Final

References

2012 UCI Track Cycling World Championships
UCI Track Cycling World Championships – Women's sprint